TSS Slieve Bloom may refer to:

, was a twin screw steamer cargo vessel operated by the London and North Western Railway from 1908 to 1918
, was a twin screw steamer cargo vessel operated by the London, Midland and Scottish Railway from 1930 to 1948, and the British Transport Commission from 1948 to 1965

Ship names